Boba Tea Company is a bubble tea restaurant chain based in Albuquerque, New Mexico, founded in 2005.

History
The company was founded by Vi and Hoa Luong. The Luongs also own Noble Collectibles, a card and video gaming shop that specializes in selling new and vintage items.

Reception
The Boba Tea Company logo was featured in "Really Good Logos Explained".

References

External links
 

Asian-American culture in Arizona
Asian-American culture in New Mexico
Restaurants established in 2005
Regional restaurant chains in the United States
Restaurants in Albuquerque, New Mexico
2005 establishments in New Mexico
Bubble tea brands